Lingula anatina is a brachiopod species in the genus Lingula. Like others in its genus, L. anatina is a filter feeder that uses a lophophore to extract food from water.  They burrow in the sand of their brackish intertidal habitat.

References

Lingulata
Animals described in 1801